McCray is a surname. Notable people with the surname include:

Bobby McCray, American football player
Bruce McCray, American football player
Carrie Allen McCray, African-American writer
Chirlane McCray, African-American writer and activist, Wife of NYC mayor Bill de Blasio
Chris McCray, American professional basketballer
David McCray, German professional basketballer
Ewan McCray, English cricketer
John Henry McCray, American journalist
Larry McCray, American blues guitarist and singer
Lane McCray, American singer famous for the successful duo La Bouche
L. J. McCray, American football player
Nikki McCray, American former professional basketball player
Prentice McCray, former American football safety in the NFL
Richard McCray (born 1937), American astronomer and astrophysicist
Robert McCray (born 1996), American football player
Rodney McCray (basketball), basketball player who played in the NBA for several teams
Rodney McCray (baseball), baseball player best known for crashing through the outfield wall of Civic Stadium in Portland, Oregon
Rube McCray, head coach for the William & Mary Tribe men's basketball team between 1943-1945.
Scooter McCray, retired American professional basketball player
Tim McCray, Canadian Football League running back
Trinity McCray, American dancer, model and professional wrestler
Warren T. McCray, 30th Governor of the U.S. state of Indiana from 1921 to 1924